Ulianivka is an urban-type settlement in Sumy Raion of Sumy Oblast in Ukraine. It is located on the banks of the Vyr, a left tributary of the Seym in the drainage basin of the Dnieper. Ulianivka belongs to Mykolaivka settlement hromada, one of the hromadas of Ukraine. Population: 

Until 18 July 2020, Ulianivka belonged to Bilopillia Raion. The raion was abolished in July 2020 as part of the administrative reform of Ukraine, which reduced the number of raions of Sumy Oblast to five. The area of Bilopillia Raion was merged into Sumy Raion.

Economy

Transportation
It is on the railway connecting Sumy and Vorozhba. There is infrequent passenger traffic.

Ulianivka is connected by road with Sumy, Vorozhba, and Konotop.

References

Urban-type settlements in Sumy Raion